Godminster Lane Quarry and Railway Cutting is a 0.8 hectare geological Site of Special Scientific Interest at Pitcombe in Somerset, notified in 1971.

This is an important locality for study of the Inferior Oolite limestones, of Middle Jurassic age, laid down in a warm shallow sea some 175 million years ago. The site is unique in that the limestones seen here are much more closely comparable with rocks of similar age found in the Cotswolds than with rock sequences seen elsewhere in Somerset. However, the rocks do contain the rich assemblage of fossil ammonites which are typical of the north Dorset/south Somerset area and it is this feature, combined with the unusual limestone sequence, which makes this site unique. It is also important as a reference site for three sub-divisions (zones) of the Inferior Oolite — the laeviscula, discites and concavum Zones.

See also
 Bruton Railway Cutting

References
 English Nature citation sheet for the site (accessed 10 August 2006)

External links
 English Nature website (SSSI information)

Sites of Special Scientific Interest in Somerset
Sites of Special Scientific Interest notified in 1971
Railway cuttings in the United Kingdom
Rail transport in Somerset
Quarries in Somerset
Geology of Somerset